Paralacydes vocula is a moth of the  family Erebidae. It was described by Stoll in 1790. It is found in South Africa and Tanzania.

References

Spilosomina
Moths described in 1790